Ray Point is a small rural unincorporated community in Live Oak County, Texas, United States.  It is a German farming community typical for much of Texas.  The most prominent remaining structures are the Ray Point community center and the Ray Point Mercantile (closed).  Nearby is the Ray Point cemetery. The nearest city is Three Rivers.

Demographics 
In 1990 there were 75 people living in the community according to the Handbook of Texas Online.

References

External links
 

Unincorporated communities in Live Oak County, Texas
Unincorporated communities in Texas